Deerpark is a town in the western part of Orange County, New York, United States, and part of the New York metropolitan area. As of the 2020 Census, the population was at 7,509.  The center of population of New York is located in Cuddebackville, a hamlet in Deerpark. Cuddebackville and Deerpark most prominently serve as the headquarters of both the global Falun Gong religious movement and the Shen Yun performance arts troupe, based at the Dragon Springs compound.

History
Dutch colonists settled in the area in the 17th century, centered on a Dutch settlement named Mahackamack. The settlement was part of the boundary dispute between New York and New Jersey, which was not resolved until 1773. During the American Revolution, the village was sacked and burned. Following the revolution, The town of Deerpark was organized in 1798 from the town of Mamakating after Port Jervis was set apart from the territory. During the 19th century, the Delaware and Hudson Canal ran through the town.

Geography
It is considered the second largest town in area in Orange County.

The southwestern town line is the border of Pennsylvania, marked by the Delaware River. The western and northern town lines are the border of Sullivan County, New York. The Neversink River flows through the town. The city of Port Jervis is located at the southern corner of the town, and a small portion of the town borders on Montague Township, New Jersey.

US Route 209 parallels the course of the Neversink River. Hawk's Nest scenic overlook along New York State Route 97 offers views of the Delaware River. Interstate 84 passes through the southern portion of town near the New Jersey state line.

Demographics

As of the census of 2000, there were 7,858 people, 2,906 households, and 2,115 families residing in the town. The population density was 118.3 people per square mile (45.7/km2). There were 3,332 housing units at an average density of 50.2 per square mile (19.4/km2). The racial makeup of the town was 90.52% white, 5.54% African American, .27% Native American, .57% Asian, .74% from other races, and 1.36% from two or more races. Hispanic or Latino of any race were 5.82% of the population.

There were 2,906 households, out of which 35.7% had children under the age of 18 living with them, 58.4% were married couples living together, 9% had a female householder with no husband present, and 27.2% were non-families. 20.9% of all households were made up of individuals, and 7.9% had someone living alone who was 65 years of age or older. The average household size was 2.7 and the average family size was 3.12.

In the town, the population was spread out, with 27.5% under the age of 18, 6.3% from 18 to 24, 29.4% from 25 to 44, 25.8% from 45 to 64, and 11.0% who were 65 years of age or older. The median age was 38 years. For every 100 females, there were 100.1 males. For every 100 females age 18 and over, there were 97.5 males.

The median income for a household in the town was $45,000, and the median income for a family was $49,987. Males had a median income of $40,070 versus $25,642 for females. The per capita income for the town was $18,252. About 7.4% of families and 14.8% of the population were below the poverty line, including 10.9% of those under age 18 and 5.5% of those age 65 or over.

Communities and locations
 Cahoonzie – A hamlet in the western part of the town on NY-42.
 Cuddebackville – A hamlet at the intersection of US-209 and NY-211, located approximately ten miles north of Port Jervis. The community was named after Colonel William Cuddeback, the original owner of the site.
 Dragon Springs – A compound of the Falun Gong movement, home to its leader Li Hongzhi and many of his followers.
 Godeffroy – A small hamlet south of Cuddebackville on US-209.
 Huguenot – A hamlet north of Port Jervis on US-209. Huguenot Schoolhouse and Neversink Valley Grange Hall No. 1530 are listed on the National Register of Historic Places. The community is named after the Huguenot immigrants that moved there to escape religious persecution.
 Montague Valley Wildlife Management Area – A conservation area near Cahoonzie.
 Paradise – A hamlet on County Road 7 by the northern town line.
 Port Orange – A hamlet north of Cuddebackville on US-209.
 Prospect Hill – A hamlet west of Cuddebackville.
 Rio – A hamlet on NY-42 near the northern town line. Cottage in the Pines was listed on the National Register of Historic Places in 2015.
 Roses Point – A location south of Cuddebackville on US-209.
 Sparrowbush – A hamlet and census-designated place west of Port Jervis on NY-42 and the Delaware River.
 Westbrookville – A hamlet north of Cuddebackville on US-209, located on the border of Orange and Sullivan County

Education
Port Jervis School District serves most of Deerpark, including Sparrow Bush. A small portion is zoned to Eldred Central School District.

The Port Jervis district operates Hamilton Bicentennial Elementary School (HBE) in Cuddebackville. Additionally Anna S. Kuhl Elementary School is in Deerpark, but with a Port Jervis postal address. The zoned secondary schools for the district are Port Jervis Middle School and Port Jervis High School, the former in Port Jervis, and the latter in Deerpark but with a Port Jervis postal address. Kuhl and Port Jervis High are on the same property.

Notable people 

 Karl Brabenec, former town supervisor and member of the New York State Assembly, from the 98th District (2014–present)
 Bruce Manning, filmmaker, screenwriter, and novelist 
 William H. Cuddeback, politician and judge who was on the New York Court of Appeals  (1912–1919)
 Thomas Samuel Swartwout, early settler and founder of the town

See also

 Chinese people in New York City
 Cuddebackville Dam
 Neversink Preserve
 Huguenot Schoolhouse

References
Notes

External links

 Official website

Towns in Orange County, New York
Neversink River
Poughkeepsie–Newburgh–Middletown metropolitan area
Towns in the New York metropolitan area
New York (state) populated places on the Delaware River